Riikka Sirviö (born 11 April 1974) is a Finnish former cross-country skier who competed from 1994 to 2003. She won a bronze medal at the 4 × 5 km relay in the 1997 FIS Nordic World Ski Championships and had her best finish of sixth in the 15 km event at the 1991 FIS Nordic World Ski Championships.

Sirviö had seven individual victories at 5 km (all in Finland) from 1997 to 2002.

Cross-country skiing results
All results are sourced from the International Ski Federation (FIS).

World Championships
 1 medal – (1 bronze)

a.  Cancelled due to extremely cold weather.

World Cup

Season standings

Team podiums
5 podiums – (4 , 1 )

Note:   Until the 1999 World Championships, World Championship races were included in the World Cup scoring system.

References

External links

Finnish female cross-country skiers
1974 births
Living people
FIS Nordic World Ski Championships medalists in cross-country skiing
People from Kajaani
Sportspeople from Kainuu
20th-century Finnish women